Ikko may refer to:

Ikkō-shū, a Buddhist sect
Ikkō-ikki, mobs who rose up against samurai rule in 15th- and 16th-century Japan

People 
Ikko (makeup artist) (born 1962), Japanese makeup artist and TV personality
, Japanese politician
, photographer
, Japanese actor
, Japanese graphic designer

Japanese masculine given names